Haemunah ("The Faith") is a song written in the late 19th century by Abraham Isaac Kook. It places the Torah as the central component of the Jewish People's return to its land (Eretz Yisrael), and sees this process as a bigger step for the redemption of Israel, and by extension the world.

Words

References

Hebrew-language songs
Jewish liturgical poems
Abraham Isaac Kook